Burndy Library is one of the world's largest collections of books on the history of science and technology.

History
Founded in 1941 in Norwalk, Connecticut by the electrical engineer, industrialist, and historian Bern Dibner, the library holdings include important scientific literature from antiquity to the 20th century. Highlights of the collection include one of the world's most complete sets of the works of Isaac Newton, including books owned and annotated by Newton, as well as some sixty manuscripts by Newton, multiple books about Leonardo da Vinci, all of Darwin's works, and important manuscript and print materials by Louis Pasteur, a 1544 edition of Archimedes' mathematical text Philosophi ac Geometrae and many important original works from the 18th and 19th centuries. Generally, the collection's strengths are in the early modern period, and include strong holdings in the history of mathematics, astronomy, and color theory.

The "Burndy" appellation was invented by Dibner and represents a portmanteau or blend of his first and last names.

The library was originally located at the Burndy Engineering Company in Norwalk, Connecticut. In 1974 Dibner donated one-quarter of the library holdings to the Smithsonian Institution to form the nucleus of its research library in the history of science and technology. In 1976, the Dibner Library of the History of Science and Technology opened at the Smithsonian Institution, and it remains part of the Smithsonian Institution Libraries housed at the National Museum of American History, Behring Center in Washington, DC.

The remainder of the Burndy Library collection remained in Norwalk until after Bern Dibner's death in 1988. It was moved to the campus of the Massachusetts Institute of Technology (MIT) in 1992 with the establishment of the Dibner Institute for the History of Science and Technology. After residing there for more than a decade, the collection needed to be moved due to the pending demolition of the building which housed it.

In November 2006,  67,000 volumes of the Burndy Library (47,000 rare books and 20,000 reference books), along with several hundred small manuscript collections and a collection of artwork and objects, were transferred to The Huntington Library in San Marino, California as a gift of the Dibner family and the Dibner Fund. The library offers a number of history of science fellowships, a lecture series and an annual conference. It is one of the Huntington's most heavily used collections, and continues to grow and expand through the Huntington's multi-faceted approach to collection use, conservation and management.

References

External links
 The Burndy Library at MIT
 The Huntington Library

University and college academic libraries in the United States
Culture of Norwalk, Connecticut
Massachusetts Institute of Technology
Libraries in Massachusetts
Libraries established in 1941
Libraries in Fairfield County, Connecticut
Huntington Library